Sidney Brownsberger (born September 20, 1845, Perrysburg, Ohio; died August 13, 1930, Fletcher, North Carolina) was an American Seventh-day Adventist educator and administrator. He helped to develop Battle Creek College (now Andrews University) and later Healdsburg College (now Pacific Union College).

Early years

Sidney Brownsberger was the youngest of eight children born to the family of John and Barbara Brownsberger. Twelve years before Sidney was born, the family moved from southern Pennsylvania to Perrysburg, Ohio.

In 1865, he completed preparatory studies at Baldwin University.  In 1869, he enrolled in the University of Michigan to pursue a classical degree. graduating with an A.B.
 At the University of Michigan, Brownsberger served on the academic senate.

While a student at Ann Arbor, he first heard of Seventh-day Adventists. He sent for all the literature printed by the church at the time. As a student he spent much of his spare time studying the Bible and the Adventist books he had acquired. Agreeing  with what he read, without ever having seen a Seventh-day Adventist, he began keeping the Sabbath alone during his junior year in college in 1868.

Brownsberger's early commitment to his newfound faith faltered. Looking back at those early years of struggling faith, he described the Holy Spirit striving with him telling him to stop trifling and be a man. After his graduation he became superintendent of schools in Maumee, Ohio, and then  superintendent of schools in Delta, Ohio. It was here that he resumed his observance of the Sabbath. The following year (1873), Adventist church leaders invited him to head the fledgling school that had been established in Battle Creek, Michigan.

Battle Creek College

Adventist interest in education began in the 1850s. James White wrote out reasons for the development of Church schools in the Review and Herald. The first school on record is one started at Buck's Bridge. Goodloe Bell began a school at Battle Creek  with the Kellogg and White children. When plans developed for a formal College, the organizers turned to Brownsberger. Goodloe Bell did not have the decree standing of Brownsberger.

In 1872, Ellen White had published her views on "Proper Education". She presented these to the board of the new school. Afterwards, people turned to Brownsberger for his reaction. He said he knew nothing about managing such a school; manual labor combined with education based on the Bible.

The board decided to start an ordinary school rather than one meeting Ellen White's recommendation.

Brownsberger would later observe that Ellen White's educational principles were so far advanced that no one understood how to implement them.

Disrupted marital life

While at Healdsburg College, Brownsberger's marriage broke down. His wife divorced him; he didn't contest the divorce. Sometime later he married his secretary. Willie White, Ellen G. White's son and assistant, commented about the difficult relationship Brownsberger had with his first wife. While in Australia, Ellen White wrote a letter to Haskell discussing Brownsberger's situation. She reported that he had confessed his wrong and that she believed that God had forgiven him. However, she expressed concern that his record would follow him. Otherwise, she would have invited him to come to Australia and work for the church there.

See also 

 Seventh-day Adventist Church
 Seventh-day Adventist theology
 Seventh-day Adventist eschatology
 History of the Seventh-day Adventist Church
 Teachings of Ellen White
 Inspiration of Ellen White
 Prophecy in the Seventh-day Adventist Church
 Investigative judgment
 The Pillars of Adventism
 Second Advent
 Baptism by Immersion
 Conditional Immortality
 Historicism
 Three Angels' Messages
 End times
 Sabbath in Seventh-day Adventism
 Ellen G. White
 Adventist
 Seventh-day Adventist Church Pioneers
 Seventh-day Adventist worship

References

Bibliography

External links

1845 births
1930 deaths
Seventh-day Adventist religious workers
Heads of universities and colleges in the United States
University of Michigan College of Literature, Science, and the Arts alumni
American Seventh-day Adventists
Andrews University
Pacific Union College presidents
People from Perrysburg, Ohio